Thomas Fonnereau (27 October 1699, in London – 20 March 1779) was a British merchant and politician who sat in the House of Commons between 1741 and 1779.

Fonnrereau was the eldest son of Claude Fonnereau, a wealthy Huguenot merchant who had settled in Ipswich. He succeeded his father in 1740, inheriting his estates, which included Christchurch Mansion in Ipswich.

Returned for Sudbury in 1741, he continued to sit for that constituency until 1768, several of those years in conjunction with Thomas Walpole, a business connection. However, he retained interests in Suffolk and was a member of the Free British Fishery Society, as well as MP for the constituency of Aldeburgh at the end of his life, serving briefly alongside his brother, Zachary Philip Fonnereau.

He died unmarried in 1779 and was succeeded by his brother, Dr. Claudius Fonnereau (1701-1785).

References

1699 births
1779 deaths
Members of the Parliament of Great Britain for English constituencies
British MPs 1741–1747
British MPs 1747–1754
British MPs 1754–1761
British MPs 1761–1768
British MPs 1768–1774
British MPs 1774–1780